Kailash: A Journal of Himalayan Studies is a scholarly journal that started publication in 1973. The journal focuses on the history and anthropology of the Himalayan region. Printed on traditional rice paper in Kathmandu, Nepal, it is difficult to acquire and only a handful of university libraries have assembled a complete set. Some articles are available in PDF or HTML format.

References

Asian history journals
Publications established in 1973
Anthropology journals
Himalayas
South Asian studies journals